Q93 may refer to:

Radio stations 

Canada
 CHLQ-FM, in Charlottetown, Prince Edward Island
 CKSQ-FM, in Stettler, Alberta

United States
 KALQ-FM, in Alamosa, Colorado
 KQID-FM, in Alexandria, Louisiana
 WNOX, in Karns, Tennessee
 WQUE-FM, in New Orleans, Louisiana

Other uses 
 Ad-Dhuha, a surah of the Quran